Claude Smeal (22 September 1918 – 1 January 1993) was an Australian long-distance runner. He competed in the marathon at the 1952 Summer Olympics."

References

External links
 

1918 births
1993 deaths
Athletes (track and field) at the 1952 Summer Olympics
Australian male long-distance runners
Australian male marathon runners
Olympic athletes of Australia
Athletes from Sydney
20th-century Australian people